Musk-Ox is a novella by Nikolai Leskov, first published in the April, No. 4 1863 issue of Otechestvennye Zapiski. According to the author, it was written on 28 November 1862 in Paris, France. The text of the novel has been revised twice, first before its inclusion into the Stories and Sketches by M. Stebnitsky (vol. I, 1867) and later for the first edition of The Works by N.S. Leskov (vol. VI, 1890).

Plot summary
An ex-seminary student Vasily Bogoslovsky, a.k.a. Ovtsebyk (Musk-Ox, a nickname referring both to peculiarities of his appearance and certain habits) is an eccentric whose every step and phrase baffles and amuses people. He detests what's going on around him, but is uncapable of any practical work, spending his time loitering in the woods, reading Latin philosophers and visiting his old friends from time to time, reminding them about his urgent need of finding any kind of employment.

Alexander Sviridov, once a serf peasant and now a successful building engineer, entrepreneur and businessman, is a direct opposite: intelligent and good-natured, he is a practical man, enjoying all-round respect and admiration. It is to him and Nastasya Petrovna, his beautiful wife, that the narrator comes asking to help find for Ovtsebyk just any occupation to keep him from trouble. Alexander and Nastasya try their best but fail. Ovtsebyk shies the caring Nastasya, and ignores whatever work he's presented with, preferring to wander around, 'agitating' against the general state of things. Developing an almost irrational hatred towards the only man who's eager to give him work and shelter, he's deeply pained by the way the "common people" he cares for, love the latter and ignore his own anti-social 'sermons'. Unable to cope with this unfairness, he hangs himself.

Reception
According to Maxim Gorky, 
"This was the prelude to this 'avengeful' novel, No Way Out," the author's son Andrey Leskov wrote in his biography. The Great Soviet Encyclopedia (1979) also mentions Musk-ox alongside No Way Out and Neglected People as being were "directed against the 'new men'."

References

External links 
 Овцебык. The original Russian text. 

Novellas by Nikolai Leskov
1863 Russian novels
Works originally published in Otechestvennye Zapiski